Allison Sansom (born July 31, 1994), also known as by Thai name Pimbongkod Chankaew is a Thai-American beauty pageant titleholder who won the title of Miss Thai New Year USA 2013 and placed first runner-up at Miss Universe Thailand 2014 and represented Thailand in the Miss Universe 2014 pageant after the winner Weluree Ditsayabut resigned her title.

Early life and education
Sansom was born and raised in Eagle Rock, Los Angeles, to a German-American father and a Thai mother.
In 2012, she graduated from Eagle Rock High School and she studied at Pasadena City College in California, United States.

Pageantry
Sansom competed in Miss Universe Thailand 2014 and won first runner-up. A month later, Weluree Ditsayabut, who was crowned Miss Universe Thailand 2014, resigned her title, Sansom represented Thailand at Miss Universe 2014. Although considered to be a strong candidate by many, she failed to place in the Top 15.

References

External links
Official Miss Universe Thailand website               
                                  

Beauty pageant contestants from California
Pimbongkod Chankaew
1995 births
Living people
Pimbongkod Chankaew
Pimbongkod Chankaew
Female models from California
American people of German descent
American people of Thai descent
Miss Universe 2014 contestants
Pimbongkod Chankaew
People from Los Angeles
Pimbongkod Chankaew